A 1,2-rearrangement or 1,2-migration or 1,2-shift or Whitmore 1,2-shift is an organic reaction where a substituent moves from one atom to another atom in a chemical compound. In a 1,2 shift the movement involves two adjacent atoms but moves over larger distances are possible. In the example below the substituent R moves from carbon atom C2 to C3.
 

The rearrangement is intramolecular and the starting compound and reaction product are structural isomers. The 1,2-rearrangement belongs to a broad class of chemical reactions called rearrangement reactions.

A rearrangement involving a hydrogen atom is called a 1,2-hydride shift.  If the substituent being rearranged is an alkyl group, it is named according to the alkyl group's anion: i.e. 1,2-methanide shift, 1,2-ethanide shift, etc.

Reaction mechanism 
A 1,2-rearrangement is often initialised by the formation of a reactive intermediate such as:
a carbocation by heterolysis in a nucleophilic rearrangement or anionotropic rearrangement
a carbanion in an electrophilic rearrangement or cationotropic rearrangement
a free radical by homolysis
a nitrene.

The driving force for the actual migration of a substituent in step two of the rearrangement is the formation of a more stable intermediate. For instance a tertiary carbocation is more stable than a secondary carbocation and therefore the SN1 reaction of neopentyl bromide with ethanol yields tert-pentyl ethyl ether. 
 
Carbocation rearrangements are more common than the carbanion or radical counterparts. This observation can be explained on the basis of Hückel's rule. A cyclic carbocationic transition state is aromatic and stabilized because it holds 2 electrons. In an anionic transition state on the other hand 4 electrons are present thus antiaromatic and destabilized. A radical transition state is neither stabilized or destabilized.

The most important carbocation 1,2-shift is the Wagner–Meerwein rearrangement. A carbanionic 1,2-shift is involved in the benzilic acid rearrangement.

Radical 1,2-rearrangements
The first radical 1,2-rearrangement reported by Heinrich Otto Wieland in 1911 was the conversion of bis(triphenylmethyl)peroxide 1 to the tetraphenylethane 2.

The reaction proceeds through the triphenylmethoxyl radical A, a rearrangement to diphenylphenoxymethyl C and its dimerization. It is unclear to this day whether in this rearrangement the cyclohexadienyl radical intermediate B is a transition state or a reactive intermediate as it (or any other such species) has thus far eluded detection by ESR spectroscopy.

An example of a less common radical 1,2-shift can be found in the gas phase pyrolysis of certain polycyclic aromatic compounds. The energy required in an aryl radical for the 1,2-shift can be high (up to 60 kcal/mol or 250 kJ/mol) but much less than that required for a proton abstraction to an aryne (82 kcal/mol or 340 kJ/mol). In alkene radicals proton abstraction to an alkyne is preferred.

1,2-Rearrangements 

The following mechanisms involve a 1,2-rearrangement:
 1,2-Wittig rearrangement
 Alpha-ketol rearrangement
 Beckmann rearrangement
 Benzilic acid rearrangement
 Brook rearrangement
 Criegee rearrangement
 Curtius rearrangement
 Dowd–Beckwith ring expansion reaction
 Favorskii rearrangement
 Friedel–Crafts reaction
 Fritsch–Buttenberg–Wiechell rearrangement
 Halogen dance rearrangement
 Hofmann rearrangement
 Lossen rearrangement
 Pinacol rearrangement
 Seyferth–Gilbert homologation
 SN1 reaction (generally)
 Stevens rearrangement
 Stieglitz rearrangement
 Wagner–Meerwein rearrangement
 Westphalen–Lettré rearrangement
 Wolff rearrangement

References 

Rearrangement reactions